Villa Hayes is a city in Paraguay, and is the capital of Presidente Hayes Department.

Name

Known as "the City of the Five Names", it was eventually named in honor of Rutherford B. Hayes, 19th President of the United States.

Weather

Geography

Demography

At the time of the 2002 census, Villa Hayes had a population of 19,001, (10,071 men and 9,930 women). Of these 2,049 lived in the city and 16,592 in the rural area.

There is a number of different ethnicities among the city's inhabitants: Native American, European, Mennonites, and Paraguayan.

The Native Americans living in the city include members of the Nivaclé, Angaiteçé, Chané, Maká, Chamacoco, and Toba Qom tribes.

Economy

ACEPAR (Aceros del Paraguay), Paraguay's principal steel manufacturer, is based in Villa Hayes, however most of the city's inhabitants work in the cattle trade, and to a lesser extent in agriculture.

Tourism

Villa Hayes has a museum where uniforms, weapons, photographs, and other artifacts from the Chaco War are displayed. There is also a display of antique coins as well as animals of the region.

During the Chaco War, the Hospital de Sangre (Field hospital) stood in what is now the city's Main Square.
 
The city's church and historic buildings are important tourist attractions.

The Festival del Acero (Steel Festival) is celebrated annually and features many artistic and cultural presentations.

There is a monument honoring American President Rutherford Hayes and another one for Benjamín Aceval on the bank of the Paraguay River. These men played prominent roles in resolving Paraguay's borders after the War of the Triple Alliance.

The Home Office and the Economics Faculty of the National University are located on one of the main streets of the city.

In the nearby countryside are the hills Galván and Confuso, as well as Patiño and the Natural Reserve Trinfunqué Park, which shelters many of the plants and animals typical of this region of Paraguay.

The Melodia Cultural Centre is based in a house built around 1870 for General Bartolomé Mitre. It is considered historically significant and is frequently visited by architecture students from all over the country. The Center includes a library, holds information classes and is an important promoter of local culture and education.

History

In its earliest origins, the town was known as Amancio Cué. In 1786 the city became the site of a Jesuit Mission founded by Father Juan Francisco Amancio González y Escobar with the name Reducción Melodía (Melody Mission) in honor of the Governor Pedro Melo.

The town was re-established during the 1841-1862 government of Carlos Antonio López and renamed Nueva Burdeos (New Bordeaux) by a colony of 120 French families. However, it did not prosper and was founded again the next year as Villa Occidental (Western Town). In the late 1860s, when Argentine soldiers occupied the city during the Paraguayan War, they called it Villa Argentina.

Finally, the city was named Villa Hayes, in accordance with the decree signed by President Cándido Bareiro, on May 13, 1879. This name was chosen to honor the American President, Rutherford Hayes, who on November 13, 1878, had been asked to arbitrate between Paraguay and Argentina after the Paraguayan War. His award of the disputed Gran Chaco region to Paraguay made him a national hero.

On November 12, 2018, Villa Hayes and Fremont, Ohio (home and burial site of President Hayes) became sister cities.

Transportation
The main access to the city is via the Road IX Carlos Antonio López or Transchaco Road. The principal public transport is by bus routes 46 and 5.

Nicolás Bó Aerodrome (Sargento De Aviacion Nicolo Bo, ICAO:SGNB) is located near Villa Hayes, although it is used for training flights and does not have a paved runway or regular passenger service.  Passenger airlines operate from Silvio Pettirossi International Airport, approximately 22 km southwest of Villa Hayes.

Gallery

References 

Geografía Ilustrada del Paraguay, Distribuidora Arami SRL; 2007.  
Geografía del Paraguay, Primera Edición 1999, Editorial Hispana Paraguay SRL

External links
Secretaria Nacional de Turismo 
Dirección General de Encuestas, Estadísticas y Censos 
Correo Nacional Paraguayo 

Populated places in the Presidente Hayes Department
Populated places established in 1786
Presidency of Rutherford B. Hayes